is a village located in Fukushima Prefecture, Japan. , the village had an estimated population of 556, and a population density of 1.5 persons per km². It is locally famous for its soba (buckwheat noodles) and known nationally for its kabuki performances and as a gateway to the Oze marshlands.

Geography
Located in the southwestern corner of Fukushima prefecture, Hinoemata is surrounded by the mountains Komagatake, Mount Taishaku, and Hiuchigatake (the highest mountain in northwestern Japan). Between these mountains runs the Hinoemata River. It is known for having the lowest population density of any municipality in Japan.

 Mountains: Aizu-Komagatake (2133 m), Mount Taishaku (2060 m), Hiuchigatake (2356 m)
 Rivers: Hinoemata River
 Lakes: Ozegahara

Neighboring municipalities
 Fukushima Prefecture
 Tadami
Minamiaizu
 Niigata Prefecture
 Uonuma
 Gunma Prefecture
 Katashina
 Tochigi Prefecture
 Nikkō

Climate
Hinoemata has a humid continental climate (Köppen Dfb) characterized by warm summers and cold winters with heavy snowfall.  The average annual temperature in Hinoemata is 6.5 °C. The average annual rainfall is 1050 mm with September as the wettest month. The temperatures are highest on average in August, at around 19.2 °C, and lowest in January, at around -5.2 °C.

Demographics
Per Japanese census data, the population of Hinoemata peaked around the year 1960 and since declined to pre-1930 levels.

History
The area of present-day Hinoemata was part of ancient Mutsu Province and formed part of the holdings of Aizu Domain during the Edo period. After the Meiji Restoration, it was organized as part of Minamiaizu District in Fukushima Prefecture.  Hinoemata was formed on April 1, 1889 with the establishment of the modern municipalities system.

Economy
The economy of Hinoemata is primarily agricultural.

Education
Hinoemata has one public elementary school and one public junior high school operated by the village government.
 Hinoemata Elementary School
 Hinoemata Junior-High School

Transportation

Highway

Bus
Hinoemata is served by a single local bus line connecting it with Aizukogenozeguchi and Aizu-Tajima stations in neighboring Minami-Aizu Town.

Local attractions
 Okutadami Dam (Hinoemata is situated on the east bank of the dam lake.) While half the dam is technically within Hinoemata the dam is not accessible to the public from the Hinoemata side due to mountainous terrain. 
 Hinoemata Hot Spring
 Sanjō Falls
 Takeda Hisayoshi Memorial Hall

References

External links

Official Website 
Hinoemata Village(Oku-Aizu.net)

 
Villages in Fukushima Prefecture